Ivats Peak is the peak rising to 910 m in the southeast foothills of Detroit Plateau on Nordenskjöld Coast in Graham Land, Antarctica.  It is situated at the west extremity of a rocky ridge linked to Mount Elliott, surmounting Dinsmoor Glacier to the north and Desudava Glacier to the south.

The peak is named after the Bulgarian bolyar and warrior Ivats (10–11th century).

Location
British mapping in 1978.

Map
 British Antarctic Territory.  Scale 1:200000 topographic map.  DOS 610 Series, Sheet W 64 60.  Directorate of Overseas Surveys, UK, 1978.

Notes

References
 Ivats Peak. SCAR Composite Antarctic Gazetteer.
 Bulgarian Antarctic Gazetteer. Antarctic Place-names Commission. (details in Bulgarian, basic data in English)

External links
 Ivats Peak. Copernix satellite image

Mountains of Graham Land
Bulgaria and the Antarctic
Nordenskjöld Coast